Purpurin or purpurine may refer to:
1,2,4-Trihydroxyanthraquinone, a natural red/yellow dye found in the madder plant
Purpurin (protein),  a protein, belonging to the lipocalin family 
Purpurin (glass), a red or reddish-brown ancient type of glass
Purpurine, an earlier, but still occasionally seen, name for uroerythrin, the pink/red precipitate from urine